Radha Kalyana is an Indian Kannada television series, which aired on 15 July 2019 to 3 April 2020 on Zee Kannada and also on ZEE5 even before TV telecast. It stars Radhika Rao and Amith Kashyap. This series is an official remake of Zee Telugu series Maate Mantramu. This show has stopped in April 2020 due to COVID-19 pandemic.

Synopsis
The story revolves around a beautiful love story of a simple girl and a man, who is known for his arrogant attitude. How the girl turns the man into a better human being, forms the crux of the story.

Cast

Main leads
 Amith Kashyap as Shri Krishna
 Raadhika Rao as Radha
 Anusha Rai as Nakshatra

Recurring
 Rekha kumar
 Seetha Kote
 Praveen Tej
 Ashok Hegde

Adaptations

Title
This series title has taken from the 2014 serial Radha Kalyana which crossed 1000 episodes and it also aired on Zee Kannada, it stars Kruttika Ravindra and Chandan Kumar

References

External links
 Radha Kalyana on ZEE5

Zee Kannada original programming
Indian television soap operas
2019 Indian television series debuts
Kannada-language television shows